Watkins Lake State Park and County Preserve is a combination public recreation area and nature preserve located five miles west of Manchester in Jackson and Washtenaw counties, Michigan. Dedicated in 2017, it is under the joint management of the Michigan DNR and the Washtenaw County Parks & Recreation Commission. A five-mile former rail corridor runs through the park and into grasslands in the eastern portion of the preserve.

History
The park bears the name of Royal and Sally Carpenter Watkins, the first settlers to farm the area, who are known to have participated in the Underground Railroad in the years leading up to the Civil War. In 2016, the state acquired a portion of their former lands in Norvell Township using $2.9 million from the Michigan Natural Resources Trust Fund. The Washtenaw County Parks and Recreation Commission purchased 405 acres from property owner Gary Trolz in 2015; Trolz subsequently sold an adjoining 717 acres to the MDNR in 2016, which opened the way to the creation the park and preserve.

References

External links
Watkins Lake State Park and County Preserve Michigan Department of Natural Resources
Watkins Lake State Park and County Preserve Washtenaw County Parks & Recreation Commission

State parks of Michigan
Protected areas of Jackson County, Michigan
Protected areas of Washtenaw County, Michigan
Protected areas established in 2016
2016 establishments in Michigan